Mweka may refer to the following African places and jurisdictions :

 Mweka, Democratic Republic of the Congo
 the Roman Catholic Diocese of Mweka, with seat in the above town
 Mweka, Tanzania, location of the College of African Wildlife Management